Sirkazhi railway station (Code: SY) is a railway station serving Sirkazhi, a municipal town and taluk headquarters, in Mayiladuthurai district of the Indian state of Tamil Nadu. The station belongs to the Tiruchirappalli railway division, a division of the Southern Railway zone and is on the main line. Daily express trains connect it to cities such as Chennai, Tiruchirappalli, Madurai, Thanjavur, Viluppuram etc. while other express trains link to cities such as Tirupati, Mumbai, Varanasi, Bhubaneswar etc.

References

External links
 Southern Railways - Official Website

Trichy railway division
Railway stations in Mayiladuthurai district